Jaworów may refer to:
Jaworów, Lower Silesian Voivodeship (south-west Poland)
Jaworów, Łódź Voivodeship (central Poland)
Jaworów, Lublin Voivodeship (east Poland)
the Polish name for the town of Yavoriv in Ukraine

See also
 Jaworowo (disambiguation)